The Tomb of Hafez (Persian: آرامگاه حافظ), commonly known as Hāfezieh, are two memorial structures erected in the northern edge of Shiraz, Iran, in memory of the celebrated Persian poet Hafez.  The open pavilion structures are situated in the Musalla Gardens on the north bank of a seasonal river and house the marble tomb of Hafez.  The present buildings, built in 1935 and designed by the French architect and archaeologist André Godard, are at the site of previous structures, the best-known of which was built in 1773. The tomb, its gardens, and the surrounding memorials to other great figures are a focus of tourism in Shiraz.

History 

Hafez was born in Shiraz in 1315 and died there in 1390.  A beloved figure of the Iranian people, who learn his verses by heart, Hafez was prominent in his home town and held a position as the court poet.  In his memory, a small, dome-like structure was erected in Shiraz near his grave at Golgast-e Mosalla in 1452, at the order of Abul-Qasim Babur Mirza, a Timurid governor.  The Golgast-e Mosalla were gardens (now known as Musalla Gardens) that featured in Hafiz's poetry.  With a surface of over 19,000 square metres, the gardens were also home to one of Shiraz's cemeteries, and Babur had a pool built here at the same time as the memorial.  Believing they were ordered by omens in Hafez's poetry, Abbas I of Persia and Nader Shah both carried out separate restoration projects in the following 300 years.

A much more substantial memorial was constructed in the gardens in 1773, during the reign of Karim Khan Zand.  Situated on the north bank of the seasonal Rudkhaneye Khoshk river in the Musalla Gardens, the Hāfezieh consisted of four central columns, with two rooms built at the east and west end and with the north and south sides remaining open.  The building split the gardens into two regions, with the orange grove in the front and the cemetery in the back.  The actual tomb was outside of the structure, in the middle of the cemetery, with a marble slab placed over the grave.  The marble was engraved by a calligrapher with excerpts from Hafez's poetry.

The tomb was restored in 1857, by a governor of Fars, and a wooden enclosure was built around the tomb in 1878, by another governor of Fars.  Following this, the site became a subject of controversy, when, in 1899, Ardeshir, a Parsi from India began to build a shrine around Hafez's grave.  Although the philanthropist Parsi had obtained permission from an ulema of Shiraz to build the iron and wood shrine, a doctor of religious law with some authority in Shiraz, ʿAli-Akbar Fāl-Asiri, objected to a Zoroastrian building over the grave of a Muslim.  With his followers, he destroyed the half-built construction.  The people of Shiraz protested the destruction and the government ordered the rebuilding of the monument, but Fāl-Asiri opposed them and pronounced that he would destroy any building raised there, even if it were erected by the king himself.

The site remained in ruins for two years, until 1901 when Prince Malek Mansur Mirza Shao es-Saltaneh placed a decorative iron transenna around Hafez's tomb.  It was inscribed with verse and the names of the patrons of the transenna.

Present structure

Activities to restore and expand the memorial to Hafez began in 1931, when the orange grove was repaired and the Hāfezieh was altered by a governor of Fars and Isfahan, Faraj-Allāh Bahrāmi Dabir-e Aʿẓam.  Additional improvements were delayed until the Ministry of Education organised for a new building to be built, in 1935.  André Godard, a French archaeologist and architect, was the technical director of the Department of Antiquities at the time, and was commissioned to design the new buildings. Other sources however attribute the design to Maxime Siroux.

Alterations to Hafez's tomb involved elevating it one metre above ground level and encircling it with five steps.  Eight columns, each ten metres tall, support a copper dome in the shape of a dervish's hat.  The underside of the dome is an arabesque and colourful mosaic.

The original, four-columned memorial hall built in 1773 by Karim Khan Zand was extensively expanded.  Sixteen pillars were added to the four original, creating a long verandah, and on several façades are engraved ghazals and other excerpts from Hafez's poetry.

Architect of the Hafez tomb 
Andre Godard was a famous orientalist and a graduate of the Faculty of Fine Arts in Paris. He was known in the world as a powerful person in the field of architecture. He was invited to Iran in 1307 AH and was entrusted with the construction and restoration of many historical sites in Iran. Andre Godard lived in Iran for about 32 years, during which time he tried to create many changes in the field of archeology and cultural heritage of Iran by preparing a list of changes and construction of historical monuments in Iran. He and his wife also introduced Iranian historical and cultural artifacts in a French-language publication. It can be boldly said that the construction and restoration of the tomb and tomb of Hafez was one of the most enduring activities of Andre Godard in Iran, which made his name forever recorded in the history of Iran.

Gardens and tourism

Several rectangular pools have been added amongst the gardens, and well-maintained orange trees, paths, streams, and flower beds create a pleasant environment for the tourism hub of Hafez's tomb and memorial hall.  A tea house on the grounds provides refreshments in a traditional setting.  The dome over Hafez's grave is well lit at night, providing an attractive focal point.  The former tomb of Qāsem Khan Wāli is now a library containing 10,000 volumes dedicated to Hafez scholarship.

See also
 History of Persian domes

Notes

External links
 Facebook Gallery for Hafez's Tomb Contemporary and Historical Images.
 Hafez Tomb in 2012 Nowruz Celebration; Photos.
 A brief guide "Tomb of Hafez"

Tombs in Iran
Buildings and structures in Shiraz
Tourist attractions in Shiraz